Takayama helix is a species of dinoflagellates with sigmoid apical grooves first found in Tasmanian and South African waters. It contains fucoxanthin and its derivatives as its main accessory pigments.

Takayama helix has an apical groove being practically straight while still clearly bent. It possesses one ventral pore. It has various peripheral, strap-shaped, spiraling chloroplasts with unique pyrenoids and an ellipsoidal nucleus.

See also
Takayama tasmanica

References

Further reading
De Salas, Miguel F., et al. "Gymnodinoid genera Karenia and Takayama (Dinophyceae) in New Zealand coastal waters." (2005): 135-139.
Mooney, Ben D., et al. "Survey for karlotoxin production in 15 species of gymnodinioid dinoflagellates (Kareniaceae, Dinophyta) 1." Journal of Phycology45.1 (2009): 164-175.

External links

Protists described in 2003
Dinophyceae
Dinoflagellate species